NPDA may refer to:
 National Parliamentary Debate Association, one of the two national intercollegiate parliamentary debate organizations in the United States
 Nondeterministic pushdown automaton (also abbreviated NDPDA),